The Ceracini are a tribe of tortrix moths.

Genera
Bathypluta
Cerace
Eurydoxa
Pentacitrotus

References

 , 2005: World catalogue of insects volume 5 Tortricidae.
 , 1993: Descriptions of two new species of the Ceracini (Lepidoptera, Tortricidae). Tyô to Ga, 44 (3): 97-100. Abstract and full article: .

 
Moth tribes